Milan Sisojević, (born 1 October 1989) known by his stage names Kendi, Cantwait and Pablo Kenedi, is a Serbian singer.

Discography

Albums and EPs

Singles and collaborations

References

External links 

 
 
 
 Kendi on Spotify

1989 births
Living people
Serbian hip hop musicians
People from Aleksinac